Wanakawri (Quechua, Hispanicized and mixed spellings Huanacaure, Wanacaure) is an archaeological site in Peru.

See also
 Aqumayu
 Qiwllaqucha

References 

Archaeological sites in Peru
Archaeological sites in Huánuco Region